The Roman Catholic Diocese of Jashpur (Latin: Dioecesis Jashpurensis) in India was created on March 23, 2006. It is a suffragan diocese of the Archdiocese of Raipur. Its first bishop was Mar Victor Kindo, previously bishop of Raigarh, who died on 12 June 2008. On December 22, 2009 Pope Benedict XVI appointed Fr. Emmanuel Kerketta, the diocesan administrator and previous Vicar General, as the new bishop of Jashpur.

The diocese covers an area of 5,838 km² of the territory previously belonging to the Diocese of Raigarh, in Chhattisgarh state. The see has its seat in Kunkuri, where the Cathedral of Our Lady of the Rosary is located.

The total population in the diocese is 739,780, of which 185,485 are Catholic. The diocese is subdivided into 46 parishes.

External links
GCatholic.org
Catholic-hierarchy.org
Press release about the creation 

Roman Catholic dioceses in India
Christian organizations established in 2006
Roman Catholic dioceses and prelatures established in the 21st century
2006 establishments in Jharkhand
Christianity in Chhattisgarh